DAV ACC Senior Secondary Public School is an English medium school located at Barmana in the Bilaspur district, Himachal Pradesh, India. It is affiliated to the CBSE board and provides schooling from classes 1st to 12th.

Courses offered
The school provides schooling from class nursery to class 12th based on the CBSE board. Major courses taught are English, Sanskrit, Hindi, Maths, Science, Social Studies and Moral Science studies.

The school offers the medical, the non-medical and commerce streams starting at the 11th grade. Medical option includes Biology and an option between Information technology & physical education & for the Non-medical stream Maths and an option between the same. Both streams include common courses of English, Physics and Chemistry.

Moreover, there is an IT Lab that is fully air conditioned.

Besides the academic subjects, the school has special emphasis on moral education. Being a part of the DAV school society, vedic education forms a major effort. Moreover, there is an IT Lab that is fully air conditioned.
The staff teachers are very friendly to the students help them every time. A Havan is performed almost every week on Mondays where the entire school assimilates in the central arena and performs the vedic chants.

Recognition
In 2011, it was awarded the "Best of all" Rajiv Gandhi National Quality Award.

References

Private schools in Himachal Pradesh
Schools in Bilaspur district, Himachal Pradesh
Schools affiliated with the Arya Samaj
1984 establishments in Himachal Pradesh
Educational institutions established in 1984